The Hermetic Brotherhood of Luxor was an initiatic occult organisation that first became public in late 1894, although according to an official document of the order it began its work in 1870.  According to this document, authored by Peter Davidson, the order was established by Max Theon, who when in England was initiated as a Neophyte by "an adept of the serene, ever-existing and ancient Order of the original H. B. of L."

The Order's relation, if any, with the mysterious "Brotherhood of Luxor" that Helena Blavatsky spoke of is not clear.

Theon thus became Grand Master of the Exterior Circle of the Order. However, apart from his initiatory role, he seems to have little to do with the day to day running of the order, or of its teachings. He seems to have left these things to Peter Davidson, who was the Provincial Grand Master of the North (Scotland), and later also the Eastern Section (America).

The order's teachings drew heavily from the magico-sexual theories of Paschal Beverly Randolph, who influenced groups such as the Ordo Templi Orientis (O.T.O.) (later headed by Aleister Crowley) (Greenfield 1997) although it is not clear whether or not Randolph himself was actually a part of the Order.

Prior to the rise of the Hermetic Order of the Golden Dawn in 1888, the HBoL was the only order that taught practical occultism in the Western Mystery Tradition. Among its members were a number of occultists, spiritualists, and Theosophists. Initial relations between the Order and the Theosophical Society were cordial, with most members of the order also prominent members of the T.S.

Later there was a falling out, as the Order was opposed to the eastern-based teachings of the later Blavatsky (Davidson considered that Blavatsky had fallen under the influence of "a greatly inferior Order, belonging to the Buddhist [sic] Cult"). Conversely, the conviction in 1883 of the Secretary of the Order, Thomas Henry Burgoyne for fraud, was claimed by the Theosophists to show the immorality of the Order.

See also
 Magical organization

References

Sources
 
 T. Allen Greenfield. The Story of the Hermetic Brotherhood of Light.  Looking Glass, 1997.

External links
 The Hermetic Brotherhood Of Luxor at kheper.net

1870 establishments
Hermeticism
Magical organizations
Max Théon